CJJR-FM is a commercial FM radio station in Vancouver, British Columbia. It broadcasts at 93.7 MHz with an effective radiated power of 75,000 watts from a transmitter on Mount Seymour in the District of North Vancouver. CJJR's studios are located on West 8th Avenue in the Fairview neighbourhood of Vancouver. CJJR currently broadcasts a country format branded as 93.7 JR Country.

The station received approval by the CRTC on March 20, 1986, and launched on Canada Day (July 1) of that year.

References

External links
93.7 JR Country
 

Jjr
Jjr
Jjr
Radio stations established in 1986
1986 establishments in British Columbia